Peter Ogwang (born 15 December 1983) is a Ugandan politician. He is the current Minister of State for Sports in the Ugandan Cabinet. He was appointed to that position on 22nd July 2022, replacing Denis Obua. Previously, he was the State Minister for Economic Monitoring and had earlier served as the State Minister for Information, Communication, ICT and National Guidance. He is also the elected Member of Parliament for Usuk County in Katakwi District, in the 10th Parliament (2016-2021).

Background and education
He was born in Katakwi District on 15 December 1983. He attended Moruapesur Primary School. He studied at Soroti Secondary School, for his O-Level studies, obtaining a Uganda Certificate of Education from there. He transferred to Tororo Progressive Academy, where he completed his A-Level education, graduating with a Uganda Advanced Certificate of Education, in 2001.

He holds a Certificate and a Diploma in Social Work and Social Administration, both awarded by Makerere Institute for Social Development (affiliated with Makerere University Business School). As of February 2020, he was pursuing a degree of Bachelor of Social Work and Social Administration from Victoria University Uganda.

Career
From 2007 until 2010, Ogwang was employed as an Assistant Private Secretary to the President of Uganda at State House. In 2011, he successfully contested for the Eastern Uganda Youth Parliamentary seat, on the ruling National Resistance Movement political party ticket. He won and represented the youth in the 9th Parliament (2011-2016). In 2016, he was elected MP for Usuk County and is the incumbent MP.

In a cabinet reshuffle, on 14 December 2019, Peter Ogwang was named to the cabinet. After parliamentary approval, he swore in as State Minister for Information, Communication, ICT and National Guidance, on 13 January 2020.

Personal details
Peter Ogwang is married.

Parliamentary duties
He has the following additional parliamentary responsibilities: He is a member of the Committee on Presidential Affairs and is also a member of the Parliamentary Budget Committee.

See also
 Districts of Uganda
 Katakwi District

References

External links
  Website of the Parliament of Uganda
 Website of Makerere Institute of Social Development

1983 births
Living people
Itesot people
People from Katakwi District
Victoria University Uganda alumni
Members of the Parliament of Uganda
Government ministers of Uganda
National Resistance Movement politicians
People from Eastern Region, Uganda
21st-century Ugandan politicians